Barkerville is a populated place situated within Pinal County, Arizona.

References

Populated places in Pinal County, Arizona